This is a list of the current and defunct physical clothing and footwear shops in the United Kingdom. This includes shoes, clothing and sportswear, but not online retailers.


Current

A–D

E–H

I–M

N–P

Q–S

T–Z

Defunct

References

 
 
Lists of retailers
 
United Kingdom
Clothing-related lists